John Irwin may refer to:

John Irwin (academic) (1940–2019), American English professor at The Johns Hopkins University
John Irwin (admiral) (1832–1901), United States Navy rear admiral
John Irwin (baseball) (1861–1928), Canadian-born Major League Baseball player

John Irwin (British Army officer) (1727/8–1788), British soldier, Commander-in-Chief of Ireland and Member of Parliament for East Grinstead, 1762–1783
John Irwin (director), Irish film, television, and radio director, see Badger's Green
John Irwin (politician) (1869–1948), Canadian politician, member of the Legislative Assembly of Alberta
John Irwin (producer), American television producer, president of Irwin Entertainment
John Irwin (writer), British writer, see The Big Fun Show
John Keith Irwin (1929–2010), American sociologist known for his work on subcultures and on the prison system
John N. Irwin (1844–1905), American politician, governor of Idaho Territory, 1883–1884, and Arizona Territory, 1890–1892
John N. Irwin II (1913–2000), American Deputy Secretary of State and Ambassador to France, 1973–1974
John Rice Irwin (born 1930), American cultural historian

See also
John Erwin (born 1936), American voice actor
John Irvine (disambiguation)